Fire of Love is the debut album of the American rock band the Gun Club, released in 1981 on Ruby Records.

Production
The Flesh Eaters' singer Chris D. produced five tracks on the album ("Sex Beat", "Preaching the Blues", "Fire Spirit", "Ghost on the Highway" and "Jack on Fire") at Quad Teck with Pat Burnette engineering. Tito Larriva produced the album's other six tracks at Studio America with Noah Shark engineering. Chris D. was also credited with the cover design for the original release. Judith Bell was responsible for the bottle label illustrations on the rear of the cover.

Reception

The album is considered groundbreaking in being the first of its kind to combine the hard, stripped-down sound of punk rock with American roots music. In turn, this innovation helped to create the punk blues style as well as inspiring countless garage rock musicians. Several musicians have cited Fire of Love as an influence.

The album was also included in the book 1001 Albums You Must Hear Before You Die.

In media
In 2006, "Sex Beat" appeared on the soundtrack to the video game Scarface: The World Is Yours.

Track listing
All songs composed by Jeffrey Lee Pierce; except where indicated

Side A
 "Sex Beat" - 2:45
 "Preaching the Blues" (Robert Johnson; arranged by Jeffrey Lee Pierce) - 3:58
 "Promise Me" - 2:35
 "She's Like Heroin to Me" - 2:33
 "For the Love of Ivy" (Jeffrey Lee Pierce, Kid Congo Powers) - 5:31
 "Fire Spirit" - 2:52

Side B
 "Ghost on the Highway" - 2:43
 "Jack on Fire" - 4:40
 "Black Train" - 2:11
 "Cool Drink of Water" (Tommy Johnson; traditional, arranged by Jeffrey Lee Pierce) - 6:10
 "Goodbye Johnny" - 3:41

Personnel
The Gun Club
Jeffrey Lee Pierce - vocals, slide guitar, backing vocals on "Jack on Fire"
Ward Dotson - guitar, slide guitar, backing vocals on "Jack on Fire"
Rob Ritter - bass
Terry Graham - drums
Additional musicians
Tito Larriva - producer, violin on "Promise Me"
Chris D. - producer, backing vocals on "Jack on Fire"
Lois Graham - backing vocals on "Jack on Fire"
Technical
Pat Burnette, Noah Shark - engineers
Chris D. - cover design
Judith Bell - bottle label drawings

Covers
 In 1998, 16 Horsepower recorded a cover of "Fire Spirit" for their 1998 EP The Partisan. 
 In 2003, Enon covered the song "Sex Beat". 
 Juliana Hatfield's band Some Girls also covered "Sex Beat" for their 2003 album Feel It.  
 Japandroids recorded a cover of "For the Love of Ivy" on their 2012 album Celebration Rock. 
 In 2013, Kim Salmon and Spencer P. Jones recorded a cover of "Jack on Fire" for their album Runaways.
 In 2014, Mr. Airplane Man included a cover of "For the Love of Ivy" on their album The Lost Tapes, recorded in 1999.

References

External links

Fire of Love (Adobe Flash) at Radio3Net (streamed copy where licensed)

1981 debut albums
Gothic country albums
The Gun Club albums
Ruby Records albums
Rhino Records albums
Beggars Banquet Records albums